Kristin Rudrüd (born May 23, 1955) is an American film, theater, and television actress.

Life and career
Rudrüd was born and went to grade school in Fargo, North Dakota. She went to high school in Fargo, and after graduation attended Minnesota State University-Moorhead. She studied acting in London, returned briefly to Fargo, and then went to New York City where she found success in theater; landing a part in Amadeus, and performed a public theater reading of Othello, which starred Al Pacino.

After she returned to 
Fargo, she started her career as a film actor. In 1996, Rudrüd starred as William H. Macy's doomed wife in Joel and Ethan Coen's dark comedy film Fargo. She had a small role in the 1999 comedy Pleasantville, also starring Macy; in a short film Wheels Locked, which received a "Best of the Fest" at the Rochester International Film Festival and as an actress in Drop Dead Gorgeous, and in the short film A Psychic Mom.

She appeared in television roles on Chicago Hope, and All My Children.

Personal life
Rudrüd is married and has a daughter, and she still makes her home in Fargo.

Selected filmography
A Psychic Mom (1993) - Judy Banning
Fargo (1996) - Jean Lundegaard
Pleasantville (1998) - Mary
Frog and Wombat (1998) - Mrs. Reverend Walker
Drop Dead Gorgeous (1999) - Connie Rudrüd, the Pork Products Lady
Herman U.S.A. (2001) - Gloria Swanson

References

External links
 

Living people
1955 births
American film actresses
American stage actresses
American television actresses
People from Fargo, North Dakota
21st-century American women